Robert Maxwell Ogilvie FRSE FSA FBA DLitt (5 June 1932 – 7 November 1981) was a British scholar of Latin literature and classical philology.

Life

His parents were Sir Frederick Wolff Ogilvie (1893–1949), director-general of the BBC from 1938 to 1942, and Lady (Mary) Ogilvie (née Macaulay) (1900–1990), principal of St Anne's College, Oxford, from 1953 to 1966.

He was educated at Rugby School then studied Classics at Oxford University (Balliol College 1950-4, Merton College 1954-5).

Ogilvie became a Fellow of Balliol College in 1957 and from 1957 to 1970 tutored students.

He was headmaster of Tonbridge School from 1970 to 1975.

From 1975 Ogilvie was professor of Humanity (Latin) at the University of St. Andrews.  He is well known for his commentary on the first five books of Livy's Ab urbe condita and his commentary on the Agricola of Tacitus.

In 1979 he was elected a Fellow of the Royal Society of Edinburgh. His proposers were Norman Gash, J Steven Barrow, Geoffrey Barrow and Matthew Black.

He died suddenly in St Andrews on 7 November 1981.

Family

In 1959 he married Jennifer Margaret Roberts.

Selected works
A commentary on Livy, books 1–5 (1965).
De vita Agricolae (1967).
The Romans and their gods in the age of Augustus (1970).
The library of Lactantius (1978).
Roman literature and society (1980).

He was co-editor of Classical Quarterly from 1976 until death.

References

A. Long in Classical Quarterly 32.1 (1982) 1.
 "† Robert Maxwell Ogilvie, 1932–1981" by Russell Meiggs (Biographical memoir; published in Proceedings of the British Academy 68, 627–636).

Scottish classical scholars
1932 births
1981 deaths
Fellows of the British Academy
Fellows of Balliol College, Oxford
Academics of the University of St Andrews
Alumni of Balliol College, Oxford
Alumni of Merton College, Oxford